The Men's Sabre Individual A wheelchair fencing competition at the 2004 Summer Paralympics was held on 22 September at the Helliniko Fencing Hall.

The event was won by Alberto Pellegrini, representing .

Results

Preliminaries

Pool A

Pool B

Pool C

Competition bracket

References

M